Heart of the Sunset is a 1918 American silent Western film starring Anna Q. Nilsson and Herbert Heyes. It was written by Rex Beach and directed by Frank Powell. It was produced by Rex Beach Pictures Company and filmed in Corpus Christi, Texas.

Cast 
 Anna Q. Nilsson as Alaire Austin
 Herbert Heyes as Dave Law
 Robert Taber as Ed Austin
 E. L. Fernandez as Longorio
 Jane Miller as Rosa
 William Frederic as Blaze Jones
 Irene Boyle as Paloma
 Leon De La Mothe as Leon Kent
 Patrick Sylvester McGeeney as P. S. McGeeney
 Hector V. Sarno as Hector Sarno
 Lule Warrenton as Lulu Warrenton
 Ray Chambelin 
 George Murdock 
 Arthur Tavares

References

External links

 

1918 films
1918 Western (genre) films
American black-and-white films
Films based on works by Rex Beach
Silent American Western (genre) films
Films directed by Frank Powell
1910s American films
1910s English-language films